Fort Lowell was a United States Army post active from 1873 to 1891 on the outskirts of Tucson, Arizona. Fort Lowell was the successor to Camp Lowell, an earlier Army installation. The Army chose a location just south of the confluence of the Tanque Verde and Pantano creeks, at the point where they form the Rillito River, due to the year-round supply of water during that period. The Hohokam natives had chosen the site centuries earlier, presumably for the same reason. To this day, shards of Hohokam pottery can still be found in the area. The Army claimed a military reservation that encompassed approximately eighty square miles and extended east toward the Rincon Mountains.

History
The Post of Tucson was established May 20, 1862, after the California Column drove Confederate forces from the area. The post was abandoned in July 1864 and reestablished in July 1865. On August 29, 1866, the post was renamed Camp Lowell in honor of General Charles Russell Lowell, who died from wounds sustained during the Battle of Cedar Creek. The post's name was changed to Fort Lowell on April 5, 1879.

Old West era
The fort played a pivotal role during the Apache Wars, providing additional protection for the Tucson area.  Far too large and well-manned to be attacked directly, Fort Lowell provided supplies and manpower for outlying military installations. During its eighteen years of operation, the fort averaged thirteen officers and 239 enlisted men. Among the units present during this period were the 2nd, 4th, 5th and 6th Cavalry Regiments, as well as the 1st, 8th, and 12th Infantry Regiments.

The orientation of the post was set according to magnetic north. It featured a large parade grounds, officers' quarters, quartermaster and commissary storehouses, corrals, quarters for enlisted men as well as for married non-commissioned officers.  The most prominent building on post was the hospital, the adobe remnants of which still stand under a protective structure. A lane lined with cottonwood trees, aptly named Cottonwood Lane, graced the area in front of the officers' houses.

Among the more well known officers to have served at Fort Lowell were the young Walter Reed, the Army physician famous for his yellow fever research, and Charles Bendire, the amateur ornithologist after whom Bendire's thrasher is named.

After the Army decommissioned the post in 1891, Mexican families from Sonora soon moved north to take advantage of the free housing. This occupation has become known as the El Fuerte Period.

Fort Lowell art colony
In the 1930s Nan, Pete and Charles Bolsius rebuilt the crumbling adobe ruin of the Post Traders Store making it their home and studio.  Through the 1940s a number of other artists moved into the Fort Lowell area establishing a burgeoning artist colony. Significant artists and intellectuals built homes and lived in the area including: René Cheruy and Germaine Cheruy, Win Ellis, modernist painter Jack Maul, sculptor and designer Giorgio Belloli, Charles Bode, architectural designer Veronica Hughart, anthropologists Edward H. Spicer and Rosamond Spicer, photographer Hazel Larson Archer and weaver Ruth Brown. The artist colony attracted writers and poets including beat generation Alan Harrington and Jack Kerouac whose visit is documented in his iconic book On the Road.

Notable artists and writers (20th Century)
 Charles Bolsius
 René Cheruy
 Germaine Cheruy
 Veronica Hughart
 Jack Maul
 Edward H. Spicer
 Rosamond Spicer

Fort Lowell and the Boy Scouts of Tucson
"The Boy Scouts had a long connection to Fort Lowell," explained columnist David Leighton, in the Arizona Daily Star newspaper on Feb. 5, 2017:

The first known visit to the old fort ruins by the Boy Scouts of Tucson, which had been established the year before, occurred in April 1912. The scouts marched out to the abandoned fort under the direction of a member of the University of Arizona's military cadet program. During the week-long encampment the boys did a lot of drilling like soldiers but also were given some free time to search for Native American relics.

A couple years later, the Fort Lowell Boy Scouts troop, which was formed from boys in the neighborhood that had grown up around the old Ft. Lowell ruins, called El Fuerte and a farming community, populated by Mormons, farther west that came to be named Binghamton. The two troops played a baseball game that year and are believed to have used the area fairly regularly for campouts, target practice etc. until about 1921, when Camp Lawton opened on Mount Lemmon. Within a few years, the Boy Scouts of Tucson became part of the Catalina Council of the Boy Scouts of America.

As the years passed, the old fort traded hands a few times, at one point being under the control of the Arizona State Museum of the University of Arizona.

In 1945, with the assistance of prominent local rancher Carlos Ronstadt, the Boy Scouts bid and obtained 40 acres of the old ruins while preventing the land from falling into the hands of developers, who were rumored to have plans of constructing a subdivision where the ruins existed.

A water system was put in place by the Boy Scouts and volunteers and three structures were acquired and donated to the site. One of the structures was used as the Ft. Lowell Training Center and another structure as the Ranger Station. In 1953, the scouts obtained the funds to have a roof built over the remains of the post hospital that still exists today, constructed a rail fence around the hospital ruins which was later replaced by a chain link fence and put up a flagpole just to the south of the remains.

While many successful scout events took place there, by 1957 it was realized that the Boy Scouts didn't have enough money to maintain the site and sold it to Pima County that year.

Fort Lowell Park

The fort lay in ruins for many years and many of its adobe structures went into disrepair. Some of the portions of the fort were sold to the families in Tucson. Among the families which acquired in 1928, large portions where the fort was situated was the Adkins family. The Adkins family established a steel tank manufacturing business on the site. In 2006, the family handed over the site (known as the Adkins Parcel) to the City of Tucson. In 2009, the city in association with Pima County created a Master Plan for the creation and development of what was to become the Fort Lowell Park. The park features ball fields, tennis and racquetball courts, a large public swimming pool, and the Fort Lowell Museum dedicated to Fort Lowell's days as an active military installation. Fort Lowell also includes a large pond.

Tucson purchased the former Adkins property immediately west of Craycroft Road on which the last of the original officers' quarters stand. Plans indicated that they would be open to the public as a museum.  However, high levels of lead paint were found and the buildings were not opened. On the north end of the former Adkins parcel stands a pile of large stones that, according to local lore, formed a wall of the guardhouse in which Geronimo was kept prior to his removal from Arizona.

The Fort Lowell Museum is a branch museum of the Arizona Historical Society, and is located in the reconstructed Commanding Officer's quarters. Exhibits focus on military life on the Arizona frontier. The Fort Lowell Historic District is the neighborhood located on or near Fort Lowell. It is set aside as a historic district.

Fort Lowell is the historical setting of the 1957–1958 syndicated Western television series, Boots and Saddles, starring John Pickard, Patrick McVey, and Gardner McKay.

A reconstructed Fort Lowell was featured in the 1972 film Ulzana's Raid, starring Burt Lancaster. However, the reconstructed fort was actually built in an area just southwest of the Santa Rita Mountains, near Nogales, Arizona.

National Register of Historic Places

Fort Lowell Park and the ruins within the property were listed in the National Register of Historic Places on December 13, 1978.  Other properties, which belong to the park or which in the past belonged to Fort Lowell, are individually listed in National Register of Historic Places and include:
 Charles Bolsius House, listed December 13, 1978, a 20th century house built around one of the fort's original storehouses
 Fort Lowell Officer's Quarter's listed December 13, 1978
 Fort Lowell Quartermaster's Quarters listed December 13, 1978
 Las Saetas, Fort Lowell Post Traders Store listed December 13, 1978
 El Cuartel Viejo, Fort Lowell Quartermaster and Commissary Storehouse listed December 13, 1978
 Fort Lowell Quartermaster's Storehouse listed December 13, 1978
 San Pedro Chapel  (St. Peter's at Fort Lowell Mission) listed April 28, 1993

Gallery
Structures and plaques located in Fort Lowell Park.

See also
 Presidio San Agustín del Tucsón, a.k.a. Fort Tucson

References

External links

 Old Fort Lowell Neighborhood Association – Museum information and history
 Arizona Historical Society Museums
 
 
 
 
 Old Fort Lowell Neighborhood Association

Lowell
Museums in Tucson, Arizona
History of Tucson, Arizona
Buildings and structures in Tucson, Arizona
Military and war museums in Arizona
Arizona Territory
Fort Lowell
National Society of the Colonial Dames of America
1873 establishments in Arizona Territory
Historic American Buildings Survey in Arizona
Historic districts on the National Register of Historic Places in Arizona
National Register of Historic Places in Tucson, Arizona